The Tour de East Java is a professional road bicycle racing stage race, that was held in East Java, Indonesia from 2005 to 2014. The race was sanctioned by the International Cycling Union (UCI) as a 2.2 category race as part of the UCI Asia Tour.

Past winners

References

External links
 
 
 Statistics at the-sports.org
 Tour de East Java at cqranking.com

Cycle races in Indonesia
UCI Asia Tour races
Recurring sporting events established in 2005
2005 establishments in Indonesia
Recurring sporting events disestablished in 2014
2014 disestablishments in Indonesia